abOUT was a Toronto-based online biweekly lifestyles and current affairs magazine, serving the gay, lesbian, bisexual and transgender communities of North America.

abOUT was founded in Buffalo, New York, in late 2003 by four partners, including Canadian journalist Duane Booth. The first edition of the magazine was released on January 19, 2004. In 2006, Booth became majority shareholder when he acquired the shares of two of the business partners, and the magazine's operations were fully moved to Toronto at the same time. The magazine continued in print until February 2010, when it was changed to an online-only publication.

abOUT covered LGBT-related news and culture.

abOUT covered a range of topics relating to the LGBT community including politics, activism, pop culture, arts, entertainment, health, fashion, fitness and more. The magazine has become known for political stands that are often contrary to those seen in other gay press outlets as well as featuring celebrity interview with artists such as Mary J. Blige, Pussycat Dolls and Felicity Huffman.

The website closed in 2011.

External links

2003 establishments in New York (state)
2011 disestablishments in Ontario
Biweekly magazines published in Canada
LGBT-related magazines published in Canada
Defunct magazines published in Canada
LGBT culture in Toronto
Magazines established in 2003
Magazines disestablished in 2011
Magazines published in Toronto